is the twelfth single by Japanese girl group Melon Kinenbi. It was released on June 9, 2004, and its highest position on the Oricon weekly chart was #15. It is a cover of "Namida no Taiyō (Crying in a Storm)" by Emy Jackson, originally released on April 20, 1965.

The song was also covered in 1973 by idol Maria Anzai, whose version went on to sell over 500,000 copies.

Track listing

External links
Namida no Taiyō at the Up-Front Works release list (Japanese)

References

2004 singles
Zetima Records singles
Song recordings produced by Tsunku
2004 songs